The Chinese dragon beard hook (also known as the Longxu hook) is a thrown entangling/trapping concealable weapon. It features a two pronged steel hook about 33 cm long.  An iron ring on a crescent-shaped body allows a rope to be attached.  The hooks consist of two spearheads, 20 cm apart. The ends of the hooks are serrated.  The rope is typically 10 metres long, and can be tied to the wrist of the user.  This allowed the user to snag and reel in an adversary, which made the weapon very popular amongst constables in bygone days. 

Training to use the weapon is much like learning to use a rope dart. The weapon hails from Song dynasty.

See also
 Flying claws
 Grappling hook

References 

Chain and rope throwing weapons
Chinese martial arts
Chinese melee weapons
Martial arts equipment
Song dynasty